European Triarchy (Die europäische Triarchie) was a book by Moses Hess published in Leipzig 1841.

European Triarchy was originally published anonymously with the intent of giving a revolutionary impetus to Hegel's Philosophy of History. Hess claims that the three countries of the Triarchy - France, Germany and England - were already striving for the emancipation of humanity. Both Frederick Engels and Karl Marx read the book. Engels met Hess in the offices of the Rheinische Zeitung, Cologne, in 1842. According to George Lichtheim, it was Hess who converted Engels to communism two years before he embarked on his lifelong partnership with Karl Marx. In fact it was because Hess argued that the revolution would break out first in England that led Engels to move to Manchester, the focal point of English industry. While his father thought Engels would gain first class experience in business by working at the centre of the world economy, Frederick saw it as an opportunity to learn about the class struggle.

Steven Marcus argues that whereas radicals based in Europe could look at the industrial heartland of England through rose tinted spectacles, it was by moving there and working on his book The Condition of the Working Class in England (1845) that Engels developed a more empirical approach to political writing and that this choice arose from reading Hess's  European Triarchy.

External link
 Die europäische Triarchie (Digital text)

References

1841 books
Socialism